Mojezat Rural District is in the Central District of Zanjan County, Zanjan province, Iran. At the National Census of 2006, its population was 12,448 in 3,000 households. There were 12,247 inhabitants in 3,464 households at the following census of 2011. At the most recent census of 2016, the population of the rural district was 10,195 in 3,119 households. The largest of its 30 villages was Azhdahatu, with 1,276 people.

References 

Zanjan County

Rural Districts of Zanjan Province

Populated places in Zanjan Province

Populated places in Zanjan County